The Hampshire League was a football league in Hampshire, England. During its heyday its constitution consisted of four divisions with over 60 clubs taking part - this included a vast number of semi-professional teams and Reserve/’A’ sides of the areas professional clubs with many famous players playing in its matches over the years, often in front of large crowds. 

The league ran for 108 years, from 1896 until 2004 - after which two competitions have since spawned from it; the Hampshire League 2004 (an unofficial continuation) and the Hampshire Premier Football League. The former dissolved in 2013 and was absorbed by the latter, which now operates with two divisions, with the top flight gaining place on the revised FA Pyramid system.

History

It all goes way back to Victorian times; an era that saw football established as a popular recreational activity with a number of clubs (some of which still exist today) being formed. In these days fixture lists consisted of just cup games and friendlies, with frequent gaps in-between and it was soon becoming obvious that a more organised schedule was required, so in 1896 it was decided to form the Hampshire League. The inaugural campaign saw eight teams taking part with the first ever fixture being played on Saturday 5 September 1896 between Eastleigh Athletic and Freemantle, who won a thrilling match 5-4 with a player called Inglefield scoring the first ever goal! The first-ever league champions were Cowes.

Administered by the Hampshire Football Association (founded in 1887), the fledgling competition quickly took off, remaining with just a single division until 1903 when there were sufficient numbers to expand, but with transport limited it was then split into regional sections with an end of season play off to decide the champions, before a main County Division was introduced. Despite the unwelcome interruptions of two horrendous World Wars (1914–19 and 1939–45) the competition continued to grow and prosper once peace had been restored, adopting the simple and best known three-tier format in 1929 with straight forward promotion/relegation between the divisions. Large three-figure attendances were common place at top-flight games, even more so at the much-loved grounds of the participating Island clubs where many legendary encounters took place.

An increase in numbers saw Division 3 twice split into two regional East/West sections for a spell from 1947–56 and again from 1968–71 after which there were enough teams to form a Fourth Division respectively before a decline in numbers saw the bottom tier disbanded in 1980. The league also briefly ran a North Hants Division from 1954–56 and for a spell during the mid-1970s also operated a Sunday competition. Although there was no official pyramid in these days, the league champions were eligible to apply for promotion to either the Southern or Western League whilst at the other end the bottom two sides would have to apply for re-election. If another team from the same local association (Southampton, Portsmouth, Bournemouth, Isle of Wight, North Hants or Aldershot) successfully applied for membership then they would exchange places.

During its prime, the Hampshire League had the likes of Andover, Bashley, Basingstoke Town, Blackfield & Langley, Eastleigh (formerly Swaythling Athletic), Fareham Town, Fleet Town, Gosport Borough, Havant Town, Moneyfields, New Milton, Newport, Poole Town, Salisbury, AFC Totton, Winchester City and Waterlooville as long-standing members before all progressed on to the semi-professional Southern League. The Reserve and ‘A’ sides of Southampton, Portsmouth, Bournemouth, Reading and Aldershot also took part for many years. The league has also been well represented in both national and regional cup competitions. Several clubs enjoyed good runs in the FA Cup; in 1920 Thornycrofts Woolston (latterly Vospers) memorably held Burnley to a draw. Newport reached the 1st Round proper 5 times during the 1950s whilst Ryde Sports in 1936, Waterlooville in 1968 and Alton Town in 1972 also reached the same stage. Several clubs also enjoyed fine runs in the FA Amateur Cup, most notably in 1910 when RMLI Gosport beat South Bank 2–1 in the Final and also in 1930 when the legendary Bournemouth Gasworks Athletic reached the final – only to lose 1–5 to Ilford in front of over 20,000 at West Ham United's Upton Park ground. This competition was superseded by the FA Trophy and Vase and in the latter Havant Town notably reached the Quarter Finals in 1986. Locally, Hampshire League clubs prospered in the county Senior Cup, two big shocks came in the late Seventies when both Pirelli General and Romsey Town surprisingly defeated Isthmian League big guns Farnborough Town to clinch the trophy. The county Intermediate, Russell Cotes and local divisional cups were also frequently won by a Hampshire League team.
  
The 1980s saw more demand being placed on facilities rather than playing ability and in an effort to raise standards and keep in line with the FA's national non-league requirements, in 1986 the top clubs broke away to form the Wessex League. Along with their Dorset and Wiltshire counterparts, the Hampshire League (which now consisted of 2 main Divisions and a separate Combination section for Reserve sides) became a feeder to the Wessex in the new look pyramid system. With the power of hindsight, it would have been better to keep the old format with the Reserve teams in at their respective levels as in 1991 most would leave en-block to join the Wessex League's newly established version, but by recruiting some new member clubs, the Hampshire League was able to re-introduce Division 3 and also launch its own cup competition. By now the League was being administered by a Committee of volunteers rather than the county FA and in 1997 the Combination section was re-introduced with its own cup competition. The section was expanded to two divisions in 2000.
 
With the Wessex League looking to form a second division, the Committee were anxious to avoid a repeat of 1986, so the top-flight was renamed the Premier Division in 1999 for which only clubs with the required facilities were allowed entry. Again, with the power of hindsight, it would have been best to simply allow these clubs to leave en masse and continue with a smaller two division competition. Sadly in 2004, after much debate, the inevitable happened when it was controversially agreed to amalgamate with the Wessex set-up and tragically the Hampshire League was consequently wound down and closed, despite it being made clear that clubs unable to obtain the required facilities within 3 years would be ejected. Many agreed that this was a disgraceful and disrespectful way to end a long-running and much-loved competition that had provided so many fine memories for generations. Vosper Thornycroft (now Sholing) were the last league champions.

However, some clubs who declined to join the expanded three-tier Wessex set-up or return to local parks football promptly formed the Hampshire League 2004 – technically an unofficial continuation of the original competition. As expected, in 2007 the Wessex League axed its third division – but rather than join the existing set-up, those clubs then formed the Hampshire Premier League, which with slightly stricter ground requirements has obtained "Step 7" status on the modern FA pyramid system. The two competitions remained separate until 2013 when finally amalgamated, promotion/relegation between the two divisions is dependent on ground facilities rather than playing ability.

League Champions

League Cup Winners

Clubs

Achievements by clubs in National Cup competitions

During its 108-year existence, the Hampshire League was done proud when represented by its member clubs in the national cup competitions, especially in its heyday as listed below, when clubs frequently progressed past the early qualifying rounds:

FA Cup

1919/20 Thornycrofts (Woolston) reached 1st Round, v Burnley (home, drew 0-0, lost replay away 0–5)
1932/33 Ryde Sports reached 1st Round, v Margate (away, lost 0–5)
1936/37 Ryde Sports reached 1st Round, v Gillingham (home, lost 1–5)
1945/46 Newport reached 2nd Round, v Aldershot (lost 0–12 on aggregate)
1952/53 Newport reached 1st Round, v Swindon Town (away, lost 1–5)
1953/54 Newport reached 1st Round, v Swindon Town (away, lost 1–2)
1954/55 Newport reached 1st Round, v Hinckley Athletic (away, lost 3–4)
1956/57 Newport reached 1st Round, v Watford (home, lost 0–6)
1957/58 Newport reached 1st Round, v Hereford United (away, lost 0–3)
1958/59 Newport reached 1st Round, v Shrewsbury Town (away, lost 3–4)
1968/69 Waterlooville reached 1st Round, v Kettering Town (home, lost 1–2)
1972/73 Alton Town reached 1st Round, v Newport County (away, lost 1–5)

FA Trophy

1969/70 Thornycroft Athletic reached 1st Round, v Weymouth (away, lost 0-5)

FA Vase

1976/77 Gosport Borough reached Quarter Finals, v Barton Rovers (home, 1-1 away, lost replay 1-3)
1981/82 Sholing Sports reached 4th Round, v Shortwood United (away, lost 0-2)
1985/86 Havant Town reached Quarter Finals, v Wisbech Town (home, lost 1-5)
2002/03 Winchester City reached Quarter Finals, v Oadby Town (away, lost 0-1)

FA Amateur Cup

1910/11 RMLI Gosport won the competition, 2-1 v South Bank in Final
1929/30 Bournemouth Gasworks Athletic reached the Final, lost 1-5 v Ilford
1932/33 Bournemouth Gasworks Athletic reached the Semi-Finals, lost 1-2 v Stockton

Historical position within English football league system
The following table shows the position of the various Hampshire leagues within the English football league system:

References

 Hampshire league archives

 
Defunct football leagues in England
Football in Hampshire